The Smokering is a Los Angeles, California music production duo Ed Vichnick and Jason D. Kuhar.
Their music blends elements of downtempo, chill-out, hip hop, classical, dub, acid jazz, reggae, Indian classical, Middle Eastern, and ambient music.

History 
The Smokering was formed in January 2005.
They produced 4 studio albums that year: 
"Escape From Van Nuys", "Fall Classic", "Poder A Le Gente", and "Tropicalifornia".

In 2006 The Smokering released the classic, "13". Four additional albums were created that year, notably "La La Land", which yielded two of The Smokering's most well received songs, "Freshoutdabox" and "Sativa".

Over the next year and a half Ed & JDK would work with a handful of established artists including Lumis James (Bazerk, Pigface),
David "Mavis" Senescu (Cynic, ONLY), and bassist Ray Burke (Bruce Dickinson of Iron Maiden, Live After Death).

In 2007 "Blacklight District" was released. This album defined the duo and realized their distinct “soundtrack" vibe. They would record 2 more albums that year: "The Motherboard Connection" and "Floatation Device".

By 2008 the duo had transformed into group form with Lumis on turntables and vocals, Ray Burke on bass,
and Leanna Burke & Larry Foster on percussion. This incarnation of The Smokering performed 4 shows that year.

In early 2009 The Smokering returned to the studio to create their 13th studio album, "Colorformed". Chillout, funk, trip hop, r&b, dub reggae, and even a touch of smooth jazz can be heard on this album.

September 2009 the compilation '05 - '09 was released digitally worldwide and features choice tracks from their first 13 albums.

The Smokering collaborated with Los Angeles based dj/emcee Lumis James on the track "Before The World Was Digital". It was recorded for "Into The Vortex, Volume 2", an IDM compilation released by Global Vortex Records in 2010. The song also aired on Los Angeles radio station 90.7FM KPFK's "Breakbeats & Rhymes" Radio Show on September 5, 2010.

Fall 2010 brought new music from The Smokering. The self-produced "Mellow Majestic" album offers a sophisticated blend of old school and nu-skool trip hop. The album was released on CD format and for digital download worldwide through the independent record label Global Vortex Records. The album received positive reviews from Hypnagogue.

The first installment of a new mixtape series by The Smokering, "Adventures In Wi-Fi Vol. 1" was released in Spring 2011.

The Smokering's first official e.p. "Disco Balls" was released worldwide on May 17, 2011.

In 2013, The Smokering signed with Chill Om Records India and released their latest album "Morningstar".

"Perceptions", a previously unreleased song, was self-released and made available for download worldwide in 2014.

Discography

Albums 
 Escape From Van Nuys (2005)
 Fall Classic (2005)
 Poder A Le Gente (2005)
 Tropicalifornia (2005)
 World War IV (2006)
 Musaic (2006)
 13 (2006)
 Scorpittarius (2006)
 La La Land (2006)
 Motherboard Connection (2007)
 Floatation Device (2007)
 Blacklight District (2008)
 Colorformed (2009)
 Mellow Majestic (2010) 
 Disco Balls (2011) 
 Morningstar (2013)

Compilations 
 '05-'09 (2009)
 Giuce Clothing Presents: Not From Concentrate Redux Mixtape (2010)
 Siesta Electronica Vol. 9 (Catharsis Records 2013)
 La Catharsis - Quatorzieme Edition (Catharsis Records 2013)
 The Winter Chill Essentials (Audio Lotion Recordings 2013)
 Private Lounge Club 5 (Catharsis Records 2013)
 La Catharsis - Treizieme Edition (Catharsis Records 2013)
 Balearic Beach Club (Audio Lotion Recordings 2013)
 Honolulu Surf Splash - Finest Chill Beach Music (Solphet Music 2014)
 Good Night Lounge - Music for Hotels, Bars and Spas (Solphet Music 2014)
 Ibiza Seasons - Spring Edition Vol. 2 - Best of Balearic Chilled Out Grooves (Karmaloft Music 2014)
 Lounge Groove Vol. 1 (Catharsis Records 2014)
 Siesta Electronica Vol. 13 (Catharsis Records 2014)
 Cafe Del Ibiza Vol. 1 - Best of Electronic Downbeats (Karmaloft Music 2014)
 La Catharsis - Dix-Neuvieme Edition (Catharsis Records 2014)

Collaborations 
 Before The World Was Digital with Lumis (2010)

References

External links 
 Official website

Electronic music groups from California
Trip hop groups
American electronic music groups
Chill-out musicians
Downtempo musicians